The Shoemaker is a play written by Susan Charlotte, first staged at the off-Broadway Acorn Theater on 24 July 2011. The play was directed by Antony Marsellis and starred Danny Aiello as The Shoemaker, Alma Cuervo as Hilary, Lucy Devito as Louise and Michael Twaine providing Offstage Voices.

Production history
The Shoemaker was first produced at the Acorn Theatre in New York City on 24 July 2011. It was directed by Antony Marsellis. The cast was as follows:
The Shoemaker - Danny Aiello
Hilary - Alma Cuervo
Louise - Lucy Devito
Offstage Voices - Michael Twaine

References

External links
 
 10 Years After 9/11 Where Are The Iconic Plays? by Mark Kennedy (AP)
 Danny Aiello Now In The Shoemaker by Felicia R. Lee (NYTimes)
 Aiello Stirs Emotions of 9/11 in The Shoemaker by Peter Santilii (AP)

2011 plays
Off-Broadway plays
Plays set in New York City
Fiction about shoemakers